= NGC 7659 =

Galaxy in the constellation Pegasus

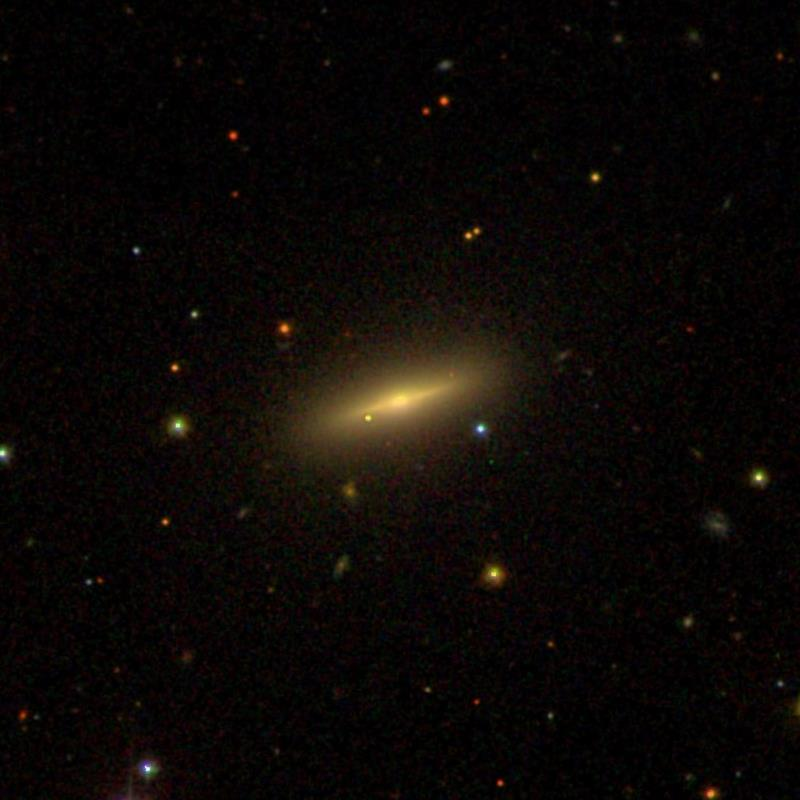

Observation data
- Constellation: Pegasus
- Right ascension: 23^{h} 27^{m} 14^{s}
- Declination: +14° 21′ 10″

Characteristics
- Type: Lenticular galaxy

NGC 7659 is a lenticular galaxy in the constellation Pegasus about 173 million light-years away from Earth. It was discovered on October 16, 1784 by the astronomer William Herschel.
